Cori Henry (born 9 December 1976) is a British sprinter who specializes in the 400 meters.

He won a silver medal in the 4 × 400 m relay at the 2003 World Indoor Championships in Barcelona, along with Jamie Baulch, Timothy Benjamin, and Daniel Caines, finishing with a time of 3:06.12. At the 2002 Commonwealth Games, he competed for England in the semifinal but not the final of the 4 × 400 m relay; his team won the gold medal.

References 

1976 births
Living people
British male sprinters
World Athletics Indoor Championships medalists
Commonwealth Games gold medallists for England
Commonwealth Games gold medallists in athletics
Athletes (track and field) at the 2002 Commonwealth Games
Commonwealth Games competitors for England
Medallists at the 2002 Commonwealth Games